Winchester Cathedral Choir is an internationally recognized professional choir based at Winchester Cathedral at Winchester in Hampshire. The choir currently consists of 18 boy choristers and 12 lay clerks and sings eight services weekly in the Cathedral. Additionally, 20 girl choristers  sing one service a week as well as concerts. Sometimes the group augments their numbers when certain musical works require a greater number of voices. The group's choristers (only boys) all attend The Pilgrims' School where they study singing, music theory, music history, and at least one instrument in addition to general academic studies. The choir regularly tours internationally, has produced numerous recordings, and appears often in television and radio broadcasts. The choir is currently directed by Andrew Lumsden, who assumed the post in 2002.

The exact year in which the chorus was founded is unknown, but it is likely that the choir was formed in the 14th century. The earliest historical document relating to the chorus dates from 1402 when a John Dyer was named as the cathedral's organist and chorus-master. A 1544 statute by Henry VIII of England decreed that the cathedral should have ten boys in the choir and a single organist.

There are also 20 girl choristers, who all attend local schools and sing at least one service a week during term-time. They sing with the boy choristers for most major concerts, at Easter and Christmas, and for the Southern Cathedrals Festival every summer (when they also sing with the girl choristers of Salisbury Cathedral). The girls have toured Europe on several occasions, and record CDs, both with the boy choristers and on their own. They have also appeared in many television and radio broadcasts, including singing live on BBC1 on Easter morning, and on Christmas Day. The Girls' Choir was founded in 1999 by Sarah Baldock, and is now under the joint leadership of the Director of Music, Andrew Lumsden, and the Sub-organist, Claudia Grinnell.

References

Boys' and men's choirs
English choirs
Choir
Church choirs
British church music